The Billy Meadows Guard Station is a Forest Service Guard Station located in the Wallowa–Whitman National Forest near Joseph, Oregon, USA. In addition to the main residence, the station also includes a garage, warehouse, barn, and oil and gas house. The residence has a rustic design; the exterior walls use shiplap to resemble a log cabin, and the gabled front porch is supported by two logs. The original gable roof was wood shingled to fit the rustic theme but has since been replaced with sheet metal. The Civilian Conservation Corps built the guard station during the Great Depression.

The Billy Meadows Guard Station was added to the National Register of Historic Places on March 6, 1991.

See also
National Register of Historic Places listings in Wallowa County, Oregon

References

National Register of Historic Places in Wallowa County, Oregon
Park buildings and structures on the National Register of Historic Places in Oregon
Buildings and structures in Wallowa County, Oregon
Wallowa–Whitman National Forest